Here Comes the Cowboy is the fourth full-length studio album by singer-songwriter and multi-instrumentalist Mac DeMarco, released on May 10, 2019, through Mac's Record Label.

Critical reception

Here Comes the Cowboy received polarized reviews upon release from critics and fans. While some critics noted a musical maturity for DeMarco and the minimalist production, most critics were divided on the album's slower pace and lack of focus. Thomas Hobbs of NME said of the album, "Here Comes the Cowboy suggests Mac DeMarco is ready to explore more mature themes and grow beyond the slacker image he has helped turn into a pop-culture staple. This record's slower pace won't be for everybody, just as unassuming This Old Dog wasn't, but, should you let it, this record will transport you somewhere calm and reflective. At a time of great chaos, that sure sounds good to me." Rolling Stones Joe Levy called the songs "stark, meditative, lonely, and stubbornly isolated, like spending 45 minutes petting a cat. A static search for comfort."

In a generally mixed review, Timothy Monger of AllMusic said of the album, "With its camera phone happy-face button cover and minimalist production, 
Here Comes the Cowboy is a mixed bag of a record beset by an overall aimlessness where some crafty low-key gems have to share the bus with a few inane 
clunkers that probably should have stayed in the vault." Rachel Aroesti of The Guardian noted that Here Comes the Cowboy may retain some of the disarming simplicity and emotional universality that has become DeMarco's trademark, but it is ultimately an album that fails to welcome the listener warmly into its world."

Year-end rankings

Commercial performance
Here Comes the Cowboy debuted at number 10 on the US Billboard 200 with 27,000 album-equivalent units, of which 20,000 were pure album sales. It is DeMarco's first US top 10 album.

In January 2023, the track "Heart to Heart" became a viral hit on TikTok. As a result, the song became DeMarco's first to chart on the Billboard Hot 100, reaching #83 after achieving over 5.8 million streams within a week in the US.

Track listingNotes'
 "Heart to Heart" features uncredited vocals by Mac Miller.

Personnel
Adapted from the album liner notes.

Mac DeMarco – all instruments and vocals, production, mixing, and engineering

Charts

References

2019 albums
Mac DeMarco albums